The Regius Chair of Civil Engineering and Mechanics at the University of Glasgow was founded in 1840 by Queen Victoria.

In 1872 the endowment was increased by the bequest of Isabella Elder in memory of her husband, John Elder. The name of the chair was shortened to Regius Chair of Civil Engineering on the appointment of William Marshall in 1952, but the original name was restored upon the appointment of René de Borst in 2012.

Borst left the chair in 2015 towards Sheffield and left it vacated for six years. In 2021, Margaret Lucas became the eleventh incumbent and first female Regius Professor of engineering in Glasgow.

Regius Professors of Civil Engineering and Mechanics
1840 - Lewis Gordon
1855 - Macquorn Rankine
1873 - James Thompson
1889 - Archibald Barr
1913 - John Dewar Cormack
1936 - Gilbert Cook
1952 - William Marshall
1977 - Alexander Coull
1994 - Nenad Bicanic
2012 - René de Borst
2021 - Margaret Lucas

See also
 List of Professorships at the University of Glasgow
 Professor of Civil Engineering (Dublin)

References

Engineering education in the United Kingdom
Professorships at the University of Glasgow
Civil Engineering and Mechanics